Émile Thienpondt (born 1904, date of death unknown) was a Belgian swimmer. He competed in the men's 4 × 200 metre freestyle relay event at the 1924 Summer Olympics.

References

External links
 

1904 births
Year of death missing
Olympic swimmers of Belgium
Swimmers at the 1924 Summer Olympics
Place of birth missing
Belgian male freestyle swimmers